This is a complete alphabetical list (A to F) of Medal of Honor recipients during the Civil War. Many of the awards during the Civil War were for capturing or saving regimental flags. During the Civil War, regimental flags served as the rallying point for the unit, and guided the unit's movements. Loss of the flag could greatly disrupt a unit, and could have a greater effect than the death of the commanding officer.

Medal of Honor

The Medal of Honor is the highest military decoration awarded by the United States government and is bestowed on a member of the United States armed forces who distinguishes himself "…conspicuously by gallantry and intrepidity at the risk of his life above and beyond the call of duty while engaged in an action against an enemy of the United States…" Given the risk of life required for earning the medal, it is commonly presented posthumously.

Recipients are listed alphabetically by last name. Posthumous receipt is denoted by an asterisk. The rank indicated is the individual's rank at the time of their Medal of Honor action.

A

B

C

D

E

F

See also
 List of Medal of Honor recipients

References

 
 
 
 

Civil War A-F
A-F
Medal